North Hampshire (formally the Northern division of Hampshire) was a constituency as one of two in the county of Hampshire proper, which returned two Members of Parliament (MPs) to the House of Commons of the UK Parliament between 1832 and 1885.  Its members were elected by the bloc vote version of the first-past-the-post system.

It was created under the Great Reform Act for the 1832 general election, and abolished by the Redistribution of Seats Act 1885 for the 1885 general election.


Creation, boundaries and abolition
The county was created as one of three divisions of Hampshire as Hampshire formerly included the Isle of Wight to make up a large area and large-electorate two-member seat due to a growing number of tiny electorate increasingly rotten boroughs since the 13th century until this was abolished under the Great Reform Act 1832.

1832–1885: The Petty Sessional Divisions of Alton, Andover, Basingstoke, King's Clere [Kingsclere], Droxford, Odiham, Petersfield and Winchester.

Under the Redistribution of Seats Act 1885 the seat was abolished; replaced by three seats:

Basingstoke or Northern Hampshire - this took in the town and two sessional divisions in the mid-north
Andover or West Hampshire - this took in Andover and Kingsclere sessional divisions and Winchester city
Petersfield or East Hampshire - this took in Alton, Droxford and Petersfield sessional divisions and the rest of Winchester sessional division (including the town of Alresford)

Members of Parliament

Election results

Elections in the 1830s

Elections in the 1840s

 

 

Heathcote resigned by accepting the office of Steward of the Chiltern Hundreds, causing a by-election.

Elections in the 1850s

Elections in the 1860s

Elections in the 1870s

Sclater-Booth was appointed President of the Local Government Board, requiring a by-election.

Elections in the 1880s

Sources

Notes and references 

Parliamentary constituencies in Hampshire (historic)
Constituencies of the Parliament of the United Kingdom established in 1832
Constituencies of the Parliament of the United Kingdom disestablished in 1885